Cymindis minuta is a species of ground beetle in the subfamily Harpalinae. It was described by Kabak & Wrase in 1997.

References

minuta
Beetles described in 1997